Roche-et-Raucourt is a commune in the Haute-Saône department in the region of Bourgogne-Franche-Comté in eastern France.

Population

Sights
 Church of the 18th century, by the architect Claude Nicolas Ledoux.
 Washing places in Roche and in Raucourt
 Fountain St Didier
 Fort in Raucourt
 Chapels St Roch and St Claude

See also
Communes of the Haute-Saône department

References

Communes of Haute-Saône